The Expository Times is a long-established academic journal of biblical studies, theology, and ministry established in 1889 by the Scottish theologian James Hastings. The journal is abstracted and indexed in the ATLA Religion Database, New Testament Abstracts and the Arts and Humanities Citation Index. The Executive Editor is Dr. Guy Bennett-Hunter.

Scope 
The Expository Times aims to combine an interest in all pastoral matters, practical and theoretical with the latest international scholarship in religious studies, biblical studies and philosophy. The journal contains resources for the month for those conducting worship: a sermon by a preacher of distinction, exegetical notes and other resources.

Abstracting and indexing 
The Expository Times is abstracted and indexed in the following databases:
 Arts and Humanities Citation Index
 ATLA Religion Database
 New Testament Abstracts
 SCOPUS

References

External links 
 
 Editor's profile at University of Edinburgh

Monthly journals
SAGE Publishing academic journals
Christianity studies journals
Publications established in 1889
English-language journals
Biblical studies journals